Tanuj Solanki is an Indian writer who is founder of Bombay Literary Magazine and author of Diwali in Muzaffarnagar, Neon Noon, The Machine is Learning and Manjhi’s Mayhem.

Published works

Awards and honors 

 Longlisted for Tata Literature Live! First Book Award in Fiction category for Neon Noon
 Yuva Puraskar in English for Diwali in Muzaffarnagar
 Longlisted for JCB Prize for The Machine is Learning
 The Machine is Learning was listed in "Top 10 fiction books of 2020" by The Hindu
Manjhi’s Mayhem was listed as an interesting book by The Financial Express

References 

Year of birth missing (living people)
Living people